Michael C. Steinlauf is an Associate Professor of History at Gratz College, Pennsylvania. Steinlauf teaches Jewish history, theatre and culture in Eastern Europe as well as Polish-Jewish relations. He is the author and editor focused on studies of Jewish popular culture in Poland. His work has been translated into Polish, Hebrew, German and Italian. He is the senior historical advisor and member of the planning committee of the Museum of the History of Polish Jews opened in Warsaw, and the Director of Poland's branch of USHMM.

Publications
 "Shakespeare on the American Yiddish Stage." American Jewish History, July 31, 2005
 Focusing on Jewish Popular Culture in Poland and Its Afterlife. Polin: Studies in Polish Jewry (16), Littman Library of Jewish Civilization, 2002. . 628 pages
 Bondage to the Dead: Poland and the Memory of the Holocaust. Syracuse University Press, 1997. . 189 pages. 
 "Poland." In: David S. Wyman, Charles H. Rosenzveig. The World Reacts to the Holocaust. The Johns Hopkins University Press, 1996. . Between pages 81 and 155
 "Beyond the evil empire: Freedom to remember or freedom to forget?" Sol Feinstone, 1991

Notes and references

American historians
Living people
Year of birth missing (living people)
Historians of the Holocaust in Poland